Nate Simpson (born November 30, 1954) is a former running back in the National Football League (NFL). He was drafted by the Green Bay Packers in the fifth round of the 1977 NFL Draft and played three seasons with the team.

References

Players of American football from Nashville, Tennessee
Green Bay Packers players
American football running backs
Tennessee State Tigers football players
1954 births
Living people